Govi. Chezhian is an Indian politician and incumbent member of the Tamil Nadu Legislative Assembly from the Thiruvidaimarudur constituency. He represents the Dravida Munnetra Kazhagam party. He was elected to the assembly in 2011,2016 and also in 2021. He is currently holding the Chief Government Whip in the Tamil Nadu Legislative Assembly from 2021 May.

References 

Tamil Nadu MLAs 2011–2016
Dravida Munnetra Kazhagam politicians
Living people
Tamil Nadu MLAs 2016–2021
Year of birth missing (living people)
Tamil Nadu MLAs 2021–2026
Tamil Nadu politicians